Chen Yifaer, sometimes known as Chen Yifa, is a Chinese YouTuber and Internet live streamer. She made her first live stream on DouYu on September 11, 2014 and rose to fame for her Internet single "Fairytale Town"() in 2016.

Chen's career as a live streamer ended abruptly on July 31, 2018 when her comments on the Nanjing Massacre in 2016 caused major outrage in China. Regarding the Nanjing Massacre, Chen read one of the danmu, which said "Japanese soldiers' blades were so sharp". During a later stream, she described one game scene as "bowing to Yasukuni shrine", referring to the controversial shrine honoring Japanese soldiers, including convicted war criminals.

Chen Yifaer resumed her live stream career on YouTube and Twitch early 2021, following a hiatus of more than two years.

References

Living people
1984 births

Chinese YouTubers